A finger joint, also known as a comb joint, is a woodworking joint made by cutting a set of complementary, interlocking profiles in two pieces of wood, which are then glued. The cross-section of the joint resembles the interlocking of fingers between two hands, hence the name "finger joint".  The sides of each profile increases the surface area for gluing, resulting in a strong bond, stronger than a butt joint but not very visually appealing. Finger joints are regularly confused with box joints, which are used for corners of boxes or box-like constructions.

Creation
Finger joints are generally created by using identical profiles for both pieces.  They are made complementary by rotation or translation of the tool with respect to the workpiece.  Typically a finger router bit is used, but spindle moulders can also be used.  Manual cutting of finger joints is time-consuming and error prone hence rarely done except in craft pieces.

Applications
A tapered or scarfed finger joint is the most common joint used to form long pieces of lumber from solid boards; the result is finger-jointed lumber.

The finger joint can also be valuable when creating baseboards, moulding or trim, and can be used in such things as floor boards, and door construction.

See also 
 Dovetail joint
 Miter joint
 Box joint
 Lap joint

References
https://www.nrcan.gc.ca/forests

Joinery

de:Holzverbindung#Zinkung_und_Gratung